Oldcastle GAA is a Gaelic Athletic Association club based in the town of Oldcastle, in County Meath, Ireland. The club plays Gaelic Football and competes in Meath GAA competitions. In 1945 and 1998 the team reached the Meath Senior Football Championship final.

Noble players:
1. Packie Kevin
2. Oran O’Reilly
3. Cian McPartland 
4. Eoin Gilsenan 
5. Darren Hawdon
6. Terrence Farrelly
7. Stephen Lawless
8. Gerard Reidy
9. Óran Mulvanny
10. Ronan Maguire 
11. Jason Scully
12. Patrick Gilsenan
13. CJ Healy 
14. Robert Farrelly
15. Colin Hawdon

Honours

Meath Senior Football Championship Winners: 0
1945, 1998 1980 1992 1983
Meath Intermediate Football Championship Winners: 2
1987, 2009
Meath Junior Football Championship Winners: 3
1937, 1944, 1956 All Ireland champions 65 times 1920-1985

External links

Gaelic games clubs in County Meath